The MIM-104 Patriot is a surface-to-air missile (SAM) system, the primary such system used by the United States Army and several allied states. It is manufactured by the U.S. defense contractor Raytheon and derives its name from the radar component of the weapon system. The AN/MPQ-53 at the heart of the system is known as the "Phased Array Tracking Radar to Intercept on Target", which is a backronym for "Patriot". Starting in 1984, the Patriot system began to replace the Nike Hercules system as the U.S. Army's primary High to Medium Air Defense (HIMAD) system and the MIM-23 Hawk system as the U.S. Army's medium tactical air defense system. In addition to these roles, Patriot has been given a function in the U.S. Army's anti-ballistic missile (ABM) system. The system is expected to stay fielded until at least 2040. 

Patriot uses an advanced aerial interceptor missile and high-performance radar systems. Patriot was developed at Redstone Arsenal in Huntsville, Alabama, which had previously developed the Safeguard ABM system and its component Spartan and hypersonic speed Sprint missiles. The symbol for Patriot is a drawing of a Revolutionary War–era minuteman.

The MIM-104 Patriot has been widely exported. Patriot was one of the first tactical systems in the U.S. Department of Defense (DoD) to employ lethal autonomy in combat. The system was successfully used against Iraqi missiles in 2003 Iraq War, and has also been used by Saudi and Emirati forces in the Yemen conflict against Houthi missile attacks. The Patriot system achieved its first undisputed shootdowns of enemy aircraft in the service of the Israeli Air Defense Command. Israeli MIM-104D batteries shot down two Hamas UAVs during Operation Protective Edge in August 2014, and in September 2014, an Israeli Patriot battery shot down a Syrian Air Force Sukhoi Su-24 which had penetrated the airspace of the Golan Heights, achieving the system's first shootdown of a manned enemy aircraft.

Introduction
Prior to the Patriot, Raytheon was involved in a number of surface to air missile programs, including FABMDS (Field Army Ballistic Missile Defense System), AADS-70 (Army Air-Defense System – 1970) and SAM-D (Surface-to-Air Missile – Development). In 1975, the SAM-D missile successfully engaged a drone at the White Sands Missile Range. In 1976, it was renamed the PATRIOT Air Defense Missile System. The MIM-104 Patriot combined several new technologies, including the MPQ-53 passive electronically scanned array radar and track-via-missile guidance. 

Full-scale development of the system began in 1976 and it was deployed in 1984. Patriot was used initially as an anti-aircraft system. In 1988, it was upgraded to provide limited capability against tactical ballistic missiles (TBM) as the PAC-1 (Patriot Advanced Capability-1). The most recent upgrade, called PAC-3, is a nearly total system redesign, intended from the outset to engage and destroy tactical ballistic missiles.

Patriot equipment
The Patriot system has four major operational functions: communications, command and control, radar surveillance, and missile guidance. The four functions combine to provide a coordinated, secure, integrated, mobile air defense system.

The Patriot system is modular and highly mobile. A battery-sized element can be installed in less than an hour. All components, consisting of the fire control section (radar set, engagement control station, antenna mast group, electric power plant) and launchers, are truck- or trailer-mounted. The radar set and launchers (with missiles) are mounted on M860 semi-trailers, which are towed by Oshkosh M983 HEMTTs.

Missile reloading is accomplished using a M985 HEMTT truck with a Hiab crane on the back. This crane is larger than the standard Grove cranes found on regular M977 HEMTT and M985 HEMTT cargo body trucks. The truck/crane, called a Guided Missile Transporter (GMT), removes spent missile canisters from the launcher and then replaces them with fresh missiles. Because the crane nearly doubles the height of the HEMTT when not stowed, crews informally refer to it as the "scorpion tail." A standard M977 HEMTT with a regular-sized crane is sometimes referred to as the Large Repair Parts Transporter (LRPT).

The heart of the Patriot battery is the fire control section, consisting of the AN/MPQ-53 or −65/65A Radar Set (RS), the AN/MSQ-104 Engagement Control Station (ECS), the OE-349 Antenna Mast Group (AMG), and the EPP-III Electric Power Plant (EPP). The system's missiles are transported on and launched from the M901 Launching Station (LS), which can carry up to four PAC-2 missiles, M902 LS with sixteen PAC-3 missiles, or M903 LS which can be configured to carry PAC-2, PAC-3, and MSE/SkyCeptor missiles in various combinations. A Patriot battalion is also equipped with the Information Coordination Central (ICC), a command station designed to coordinate the launches of a battalion and uplink Patriot to the JTIDS or MIDS network.

The AN/MPQ-53, -65 and - 65A Radar Set
The AN/MPQ-53/65 Radar Set is a passive electronically scanned array radar equipped with IFF, electronic counter-countermeasure (ECCM), and track-via-missile (TVM) guidance subsystems.
The AN/MPQ-53 Radar Set supports PAC-2 units, while the AN/MPQ-65 Radar Set supports PAC-2 and PAC-3 units. The main difference between these two radars is the addition of a second travelling wave tube (TWT), which gives the −65 radar increased search, detection, and tracking capability. The radar antenna array consists of over 5,000 elements that "deflect" the radar beam many times per second. 

The radar antenna array contains an IFF interrogator subsystem, a TVM array, and at least one "sidelobe canceller" (SLC), which is a small array designed to decrease interference that might affect the radar. Patriot's radar is somewhat unusual in that it is a "detection-to-kill" system, meaning that a single unit performs all search, identification, track, and engagement functions. This is in contrast to most SAM systems, where several different radars are necessary to perform all functions necessary to detect and engage targets.

The beam created by the Patriot's flat phased array radar is comparatively narrow and highly agile compared to that of a moving dish. This characteristic gives the radar the ability to detect small, fast targets like ballistic missiles, or low radar cross-section targets such as stealth aircraft or cruise missiles. The power and agility of Patriot's radar is also highly resistant to countermeasures, including ECM, radar jamming and use of RWR equipment. Patriot is capable of quickly changing frequencies to resist jamming.

The AN/MSQ-104 Engagement Control Station (ECS) is the nerve center of the Patriot firing battery, costing approximately million per unit. The ECS consists of a shelter mounted on the bed of an M927 5-Ton Cargo Truck or on the bed of a Light Medium Tactical Vehicle (LMTV) cargo truck. The main subcomponents of the ECS are the Weapons Control Computer (WCC), the Data Link Terminal (DLT), the UHF communications array, the Routing Logic Radio Interface Unit (RLRIU), and the two-person stations that serve as the system's human machine interface. The ECS is air conditioned, pressurized (to resist chemical/biological attack), and shielded against electromagnetic pulse (EMP) or other such electromagnetic interference. The ECS also contains several SINCGARS radios to facilitate voice communications.

The WCC is the main computer within the Patriot system. It is a 24-bit parallel militarized computer with fixed and floating-point capability. This computer controls the operator interface, calculates missile intercept algorithms, and provides limited fault diagnostics. Compared to modern personal computers, it has somewhat limited processing power, although it has been upgraded several times during Patriot's service life. The latest variant fielded in 2013 has several orders of magnitude better processing power.

The DLT connects the ECS to Patriot's Launching Stations. It uses either a SINCGARS radio or fiber optic cables to transmit encrypted data between the ECS and the launchers. Through the DLT, the system operators can remotely emplace, slew or stow launchers, perform diagnostics on launchers or missiles, and fire missiles.

The UHF communications array consists of three UHF radio "stacks" and their associated patching and encrypting equipment. These radios are connected to the antennas of the OE-349 Antenna Mast Group, which are used to create UHF "shots" between sister Patriot batteries and their associated ICC. This creates a secure, real-time data network (known as PADIL, Patriot Data Information Link) that allows the ICC to centralize control of its subordinate firing batteries.

The RLRIU functions as the primary router for all data coming into the ECS. The RLRIU gives a firing battery an address on the battalion data network, and sends/receives data from across the battalion. It also "translates" data coming from the WCC to the DLT, facilitating communication with the launchers.

Patriot's crew stations are referred to as Manstation 1 and 3 (MS1 and MS3). These are the stations where Patriot operators interface with the system. The manstations consist of a monochrome (green and black) screen surrounded by various Switch Indicators. Each manstation also has a traditional QWERTY keyboard and isometric stick, a tiny joystick that functions much like a PC mouse. It is through these switch indicators and the Patriot user interface software that the system is operated. With newer upgrades, operator's monochrome screen and physical switches have been replaced with two  touchscreen LCDs and standard keyboard/mouse on both stations.

The Army is planning upgrades to the Patriot system's radar components, including a new digital processor that replaces the one used since the system's introduction. In 2017, the Patriot got a new AN/MPQ-65A active electronically scanned array (AESA) radar that has greater range and sharper discrimination. The main gallium nitride (GaN)-based AESA array measures , is a bolt-on replacement antenna for the current antenna, and is oriented toward the primary threat; two new rear panel arrays are a quarter the size of the main array and let the system look behind and to the sides, providing 360-degree coverage. The GaN AESA radar also has 50 percent less maintenance costs. Instead of shining a single transmitter through many lenses, the GaN array uses many smaller transmitters, each with its own control, increasing flexibility and allowing it to work even if some transmitters do not.

In October 2017, the Army announced Raytheon's Lower-Tier Air and Missile Defense System (LTAMDS) radar had been selected as the Patriot system's new radar. Unlike the previous radar which could only watch one part of sky at a time primarily to detect ballistic missiles, the LTAMDS has 360-degree coverage to detect low flying and maneuvering drones and cruise missiles. The design has one large main array flanked by two smaller arrays, with the main panel still focused on high-altitude threats and the side panels, which are half the size with twice the power of the previous radar set, able to detect slower threats from considerable distance. Raytheon was awarded a million contract to build the first six radars to enter service in 2022.

The OE-349 Antenna Mast Group
The OE-349 Antenna Mast Group (AMG) is mounted on an M927 5-Ton Cargo Truck. It includes four 4 kW antennas in two pairs on remotely controlled masts. Emplacement of the AMG can have no greater than a 0.5-degree roll and a 10-degree crossroll. Mounted at the base of each pair of antennas are two high-power amplifiers associated with the antennas and the radios in the co-located shelter. 

It is through these antennas that the ECS and ICC send their respective UHF "shots" to create the PADIL network. The polarity of each shot can be changed by adjusting the "feedhorn" to a vertical or horizontal position. This enables a greater chance of communication shots reaching their intended target when terrain obstacles may otherwise obscure the signal.

The EPP-III Electric Power Plant
The EPP-III Diesel-Electric Power Plant (EPP) is the power source for the ECS and Radar. The EPP consists of two 150 kilowatt diesel engines with 400 hertz, 3-phase generators that are interconnected through the power distribution unit. The generators are mounted on a trailer or modified M977 HEMTT. Each EPP has two  fuel tanks and a fuel distribution assembly with grounding equipment. Each diesel engine can operate for more than eight hours with a full fuel tank. The EPP delivers its power to the Radar and ECS through cables stored in reels alongside the generators. It powers the AMG via a cable routed through the ECS.

The M901/902/903 Launching Station
The M90x Launching Stations are remotely operated, self-contained units. The ECS controls operation of the launchers through each launcher's DLT, via fiber optic or VHF (SINCGARS) data link.

Integral levelling equipment permits emplacement on slopes of up to 10 degrees. Each launcher is trainable in azimuth and elevates to a fixed, elevated launch position. Precise aiming of the launcher before launch is not necessary; thus, no extra lags are introduced into system reaction time. Each launcher is capable of providing detailed diagnostics to the ECS via the data link.

The launching station contains four major equipment subsystems: the launcher generator set, the launcher electronics module (LEM), the launcher mechanics assembly (LMA), and the launcher interconnection group (LIG). The generator set consists of a 15 kW, 400 Hz generator that powers the launcher. The LEM is used for the real-time implementation of launcher operations requested via data link from the ECS. The LMA physically erects and rotates the launcher's platform and its missiles. The LIG connects the missiles themselves to the launcher via the Launcher Missile Round Distributor (LMRD).

Patriot Guided Missile

The first fielded variant was the MIM-104A "Standard". It was optimized solely for engagements against aircraft and had very limited capability against ballistic missiles. The MIM-104B "anti-standoff jammer" (ASOJ) is a missile designed to seek out and destroy ECM emitters.

The MIM-104C PAC-2 missile was the first Patriot missile that was optimized for ballistic missile engagements. The GEM series of missiles (MIM-104D/E) are further refinements of the PAC-2 missile. The PAC-3 missile is a new interceptor, featuring a Ka band active radar seeker, employing "hit-to-kill" interception, in contrast to previous interceptors' method of exploding in the vicinity of the target, destroying it with shrapnel, and several other enhancements which dramatically increase its lethality against ballistic missiles. The specific information for these different kinds of missiles are discussed in the "Variants" section.

The first seven of these are in the larger PAC-2 configuration of a single missile per canister, of which four can be placed on a launcher. PAC-3 missile canisters contain four missiles, so that sixteen rounds can be placed on a launcher. The missile canister serves as both the shipping and storage container and the launch tube. Patriot missiles are referred to as "certified rounds" as they leave the factory, and additional maintenance is not necessary on the missile prior to it being launched.

Patriot missile design
The PAC-2 family of missiles all have a fairly standard design, the only differences between the variants being certain internal components. They consist of (from front to rear) the radome, guidance section, warhead section, propulsion section, and control actuator section.

The radome provides an aerodynamic shape for the missile and microwave window and thermal protection for the RF seeker and electronic components.

The Patriot guidance section consists primarily of the modular digital airborne guidance system (MDAGS). The MDAGS consists of a modular midcourse package that performs all of the required guidance functions from launch through midcourse and a terminal guidance section. The TVM seeker is mounted on the guidance section, extending into the radome.
The seeker consists of an antenna mounted on an inertial platform, antenna control electronics, a receiver, and a transmitter. The Modular Midcourse Package (MMP), which is located in the forward portion of the warhead section, consists of the navigational electronics and a missile-borne computer that computes the guidance and autopilot algorithms and provides steering commands according to a resident computer program.

The warhead section, just aft of the guidance section, contains the proximity fused warhead, safety-and-arming device, fuzing circuits and antennas, link antenna switching circuits, auxiliary electronics, inertial sensor assembly, and signal data converter.

The propulsion section consists of the rocket motor, external heat shield, and two external conduits. The rocket motor includes the case, nozzle assembly, propellant, liner and insulation, pyrogen igniter, and propulsion arming and firing unit. The casing of the motor is an integral structural element of the missile airframe. It contains a conventional, casebonded solid rocket propellant.

The Control Actuator Section (CAS) is at the aft end of the missile. It receives commands from the missile autopilot and positions the fins. The missile fins steer and stabilize the missile in flight. A fin servo system positions the fins. The fin servo system consists of hydraulic actuators and valves and an electrohydraulic power supply. The electrohydraulic power consists of a battery, motor pump, oil reservoir, gas pressure bottle, and accumulator.

Variants

MIM-104A
Patriot was first introduced with a single missile type: the MIM-104A. This was the initial "Standard" missile, still known as "Standard" today. In Patriot's early days, the system was used exclusively as an anti-aircraft weapon, with no capability against ballistic missiles. This was remedied during the late 1980s when Patriot received its first major system overhaul with the introduction of the Patriot Advanced Capability missile and concurrent system upgrades.

MIM-104B (PAC-1)
Patriot Advanced Capability (PAC-1), known today as the PAC-1 upgrade, was a software-only upgrade. The most significant aspects of this upgrade were changing the way the radar searched and the way the system defended its assets. Instead of searching low to the horizon, the top of the radar's search angle was lifted to near vertical (89 degrees) from the previous angle of 25 degrees. This was done as a counter to the steep parabolic trajectory of inbound ballistic missiles. The search beams of the radar were tightened, and while in "TBM search mode" the "flash", or the speed at which these beams were shot out, was increased significantly. 

While this increased the radar's detection capability against the ballistic missile threat set, it decreased the system's effectiveness against traditional atmospheric targets, as it reduced the detection range of the radar as well as the number of "flashes" at the horizon. Because of this, it was necessary to retain the search functions for traditional atmospheric threats in a separate search program, which could be easily toggled by the operator based on the expected threat. 

The ballistic missile defense capability changed the way Patriot defended targets. Instead of being used as a system to defend a significant area against enemy air attack, it was now used to defend much smaller "point" targets, which needed to lie within the system's TBM "footprint". The footprint is the area on the ground that Patriot can defend against inbound ballistic missiles.

During the 1980s, Patriot was upgraded in relatively minor ways, mostly to its software. The most significant of these was a special upgrade to discriminate and intercept artillery rockets in the vein of the multiple rocket launcher, which was seen as a significant threat from North Korea. This feature has not been used in combat and has since been deleted from U.S. Army Patriot systems, though it remains in South Korean systems. Another upgrade the system saw was the introduction of another missile type, designated MIM-104B and called "anti stand-off jammer" (ASOJ) by the Army. This variant is designed to help Patriot engage and destroy ECM aircraft at standoff ranges. It works similar to an anti-radiation missile in that it flies a highly lofted trajectory and then locates, homes in on, and destroys the most significant emitter in an area designated by the operator.

MIM-104C (PAC-2)
During the late 1980s, tests began to indicate that, although Patriot was certainly capable of intercepting inbound ballistic missiles, it was questionable whether the MIM-104A/B missile was capable of destroying them reliably. This necessitated the introduction of the PAC-2 missile and system upgrade.

For the system, the PAC-2 upgrade was similar to the PAC-1 upgrade. Radar search algorithms were further optimized, and the beam protocol while in "TBM search" was further modified. PAC-2 saw Patriot's first major missile upgrade, with the introduction of the MIM-104C, or PAC-2 missile. This missile was optimized for ballistic missile engagements. Major changes to the PAC-2 missile were the size of the projectiles in its blast-fragmentation warhead, changed from around 2 grams to around 45 grams, and the timing of the pulse-Doppler radar fuze, which was optimized for high-speed engagements, though it retained its old algorithm for aircraft engagements if necessary. 

Engagement procedures were optimized, changing the method of fire the system used to engage ballistic missiles. Instead of launching two missiles in an almost simultaneous salvo, a brief delay between 3 and 4 seconds was added, in order to allow the second missile launched to discriminate a ballistic missile warhead in the aftermath of the explosion of the first.

PAC-2 was first tested in 1987 and reached Army units in 1990, just in time for deployment to the Middle East for the Persian Gulf War. It was there that Patriot was first regarded as a successful ABM system and proof that ballistic missile defense was indeed possible. The complete study on its effectiveness remains classified.

In April 2013, Raytheon received U.S. Army approval for a second recertification, extending the operational life of the worldwide inventory of Patriot missiles from 30 to 45 years.

MIM-104D (PAC-2/GEM)
There were more upgrades to PAC-2 systems throughout the 1990s and into the 21st century, mostly centering on software. The PAC-2 missiles were modified significantly—four separate variants became known collectively as guidance enhanced missiles (GEM).

The main upgrade to the original GEM missile was a new, faster proximity fuzed warhead. Tests had indicated that the fuze on the original PAC-2 missiles were detonating their warheads too late when engaging ballistic missiles with an extremely steep ingress, and as such it was necessary to shorten this fuze delay. The GEM missile was given a new "low noise" seeker head designed to reduce interference in front of the missile's radar seeker, and a higher performance seeker designed to better detect low radar cross-section targets. The GEM was used extensively in Operation Iraqi Freedom (OIF), during which air defense was highly successful.

MIM-104E (PAC-2/GEM+)
Just prior to OIF, it was decided to further upgrade the GEM and PAC-2 missiles. This upgrade program produced missiles known as the GEM-T and the GEM-C, the "T" designator referring to tactical ballistic missiles, and the "C" designator referring to cruise missiles. These missiles were both given a totally new nose section, which was designed specifically to be more effective against low altitude, low RCS targets like cruise missiles. The GEM-T was given a new fuze which was further optimized against ballistic missiles and a new low noise oscillator which increases the seeker's sensitivity to low radar cross-section targets. The GEM-C is the upgraded version of the GEM, and the GEM-T is the upgraded version of the PAC-2. The GEM+ entered service in November 2002.

In 2018, Raytheon upgraded the GEM-T guidance system with solid-state gallium nitride (GAN) transmitters.

MIM-104F (PAC-3)

The PAC-3 upgrade is a significant upgrade to nearly every aspect of the system. It took place in three stages deployed in 1995, 1996 and 2000, and units were designated Configuration 1, 2, or 3.

New software update known as PDB 5 (PDB standing for "Post Deployment Build") was released in 1999 with initial support for Configuration-3 ground units and PAC-3 missiles. The system itself saw another upgrade of its WCC, and the communication setup was given a complete overhaul. Due to this upgrade, PAC-3 operators can now see, transmit, and receive tracks on the Link 16 Command and Control (C2) network using a Class 2M Terminal or MIDS LVT Radio. This capability greatly increases the situational awareness of Patriot crews and other participants on the Link 16 network that are able to receive the Patriot local air picture. 

The software can now conduct a tailored TBM search, optimizing radar resources for search in a particular sector known to have ballistic missile activity, and can support a "keepout altitude" to ensure ballistic missiles with chemical warheads or early release submunitions (ERS) are destroyed at a certain altitude. For Configuration 3 units, the Patriot radar was completely redesigned, adding another traveling wave tube (TWT) that increased the radar's search, detection, tracking, and discrimination abilities. The new radar is designated AN/MPQ-65. It is capable, among other things, of discriminating whether an aircraft is manned and which of multiple reentering ballistic objects are carrying ordnance.

The PAC-3 upgrade carried with it a new missile design, nominally known as MIM-104F and called PAC-3 by the Army. The PAC-3 missile evolved from the Strategic Defense Initiative's ERINT missile, and so it is dedicated almost entirely to the anti-ballistic missile mission. Due to miniaturization, a single canister can hold four PAC-3 missiles, as opposed to one PAC-2 missile per canister. The PAC-3 missile is more maneuverable than previous variants, due to 180 tiny pulse solid propellant rocket motors mounted in the forebody of the missile, called Attitude Control Motors, or ACMs, which serve to fine align the missile trajectory with its target to achieve hit-to-kill capability.

The most significant upgrade to the PAC-3 missile is the addition of a Ka band active radar seeker. This allows the missile to drop its uplink to the system and acquire its target itself in the terminal phase of its intercept, which improves the reaction time of the missile against a fast-moving ballistic missile target. The PAC-3 missile is accurate enough to select, target, and home in on the warhead portion of an inbound ballistic missile. The active radar gives the warhead a "hit-to-kill" (kinetic kill vehicle) capability that completely eliminates the need for a traditional proximity-fused warhead. The missile still has a small explosive warhead, called Lethality Enhancer, a warhead which launches 24 low-speed tungsten fragments in radial direction to make the missile cross-section greater and enhance the kill probability. This greatly increases the lethality against ballistic missiles of all types.

The PAC-3 upgrade has effectively quintupled the "footprint" that a Patriot unit can defend against ballistic missiles of all types, and has considerably increased the system's lethality and effectiveness against ballistic missiles. It has increased the scope of ballistic missiles that Patriot can engage, which now includes several intermediate range. However, despite its increases in ballistic missile defense capabilities, the PAC-3 missile is a less capable interceptor of atmospheric aircraft and air-to-surface missiles. It is slower, has a shorter range, and has a smaller explosive warhead compared to older Patriot missiles. 

Since the PAC-3 ground units can control both M901 PAC-2 launchers and M902/M903 PAC-2/PAC-3 launchers, Patriot batteries employ a mix of PAC-3 hit-to-kill active missiles and PAC-2 GEM-T blast fragmentation warhead semi-active missiles to counter both ballistic missile and aircraft threats.

Lockheed Martin proposed an air-launched variant of the PAC-3 missile for use on the F-15C Eagle, the F-22 Raptor and the P-8A Poseidon.

PAC-3 MSE

Lockheed Martin Missiles and Fire Control is the prime contractor on the PAC-3 Missile Segment Enhancement upgrade (MSE) to the Patriot air defense system which will make the missile more agile and extend its range by up to 50%. Patriot's PAC-3 MSE interceptor was selected as the primary interceptor for the new MEADS system when its design and development program began in 2004. MEADS is designed with plug-and-fight capabilities to support data exchange with external sensors and launchers through standardized open protocols for integrated air and missile defense (IAMD), so that MEADS elements can interoperate with allied forces on the move, attaching to and detaching from the battle management network as necessary. 

It was scheduled to enter service alongside Patriot by 2014, with expectations that existing Patriot batteries will be gradually upgraded with MEADS technology in the long run. Because of economic conditions, in 2013 the U.S. chose to upgrade its Patriot missiles instead of buying the MEADS system.

The PAC-3 Missile Segment upgrade consists of the PAC-3 MSE missile, a very agile hit-to-kill interceptor, the M903 Launching Station, a fire solution computer, and an Enhanced Launcher Electronics System (ELES). The PAC-3 Missile Segment Enhancement (MSE) interceptor increases altitude and range through a more powerful dual-pulse motor for added thrust, larger fins that collapse inside current launchers, and other structural modifications for more agility. The PAC-3 MSE is capable of intercepting longer-range theater ballistic missiles. The U.S. Army accepted the first PAC-3 MSE interceptors in October 2015, and Initial Operational Capability (IOC) was declared in August 2016. The existing PAC-3 missile is named PAC-3 Cost Reduction Initiative (CRI).

The new M903 Launching System has a modular design capable of holding a total of 4 PAC-3 launching canisters (16 missiles), 12 PAC-3 MSE canisters (in 3 rows of 4), or 4 PAC-2 GEM canisters. It can mix different missiles, such as 6 PAC-3 MSE canisters (in 3 rows of 2) and either two PAC-3 canisters (8 missiles) or two PAC-2 canisters on the same launcher, down to a single PAC-2 canister, a single PAC-3 canister (4 missiles), or 4 PAC-3 MSE canisters (in one row).

SkyCeptor (PAAC-4)

In August 2013, Raytheon and Rafael Advanced Defense Systems began to seek funding for a fourth-generation Patriot intercepting system, called the Patriot Advanced Affordable Capability-4 (PAAC-4). The system aims to integrate the Stunner interceptor from the jointly-funded David's Sling program with Patriot PAC-3 radars, launchers, and engagement control stations. The two-stage, multimode seeking Stunner would replace single-stage, radar-guided PAC-3 missiles produced by Lockheed Martin. Government and industry sources claim the Stunner-based PAAC-4 interceptors will offer improved operational performance at 20 percent of the $2 million unit cost of the Lockheed-built PAC-3 missiles.

The companies sought $20 million in U.S. government funding to demonstrate cost and performance claims through a prototype PAAC-4 system. Israeli program officials have said that a previous teaming agreement between Raytheon and Rafael would allow the U.S. company to assume prime contractor status, and produce at least 60 percent of the Stunner missile in the United States. The Missile Defense Agency has said that the U.S. Army is considering use of the Stunner as a potential solution to future U.S. military requirements.

In 2016 Raytheon announced that it had been authorised to bid SkyCeptor, a Stunner derivative, as part of its Polish Patriot bid. In March 2017 it was announced that Poland will acquire 8 Patriot batteries, with the majority of missiles deployed being SkyCeptors and only a small number of Patriot PAC-3 MSE missiles.

Upgrades

PAC-3 system upgrades continue under the International Engineering Services Program (IESP) which includes all countries that rely on the Patriot for integrated air and missile defense - as of 2022, the United States of America, The Netherlands, Germany, Japan, Israel, Saudi Arabia, Kuwait, Taiwan, Greece, Spain, South Korea, United Arab Emirates, Qatar, Romania, Sweden, Poland, and Bahrain.

The PDB 6 software update was released in 2004. This update allowed Configuration-3 to discriminate targets of all types, including anti-radiation missile carriers, helicopters, unmanned aerial vehicles, and cruise missiles.

The PDB 7 system upgrade was released in 2013. It improves radar search capabilities with a transition to digital signal processing, resulting in much better reliability and 30% longer range comparing to analog circuits. Processing power of the new command and control computer is higher by several orders of magnitude. Operator's monochrome CRT displays with hard-wired buttons were replaced by two  color touchscreen LCD monitors.

The PAC-3 Missile Segment Enhancement (MSE) upgrade was fielded in 2015. It includes a new fin design and a more powerful rocket engine.

In 2017, the AN/MPQ-65 radar was upgraded with active electronically scanned array (AESA) solid-state gallium nitride (GaN) transmitters in place of conventional traveling-wave tubes with a passive array of transmitters. The new radar has been redesignated AN/MPQ-65A. It includes a bolt-on replacement antenna array and two smaller rear panel arrays which provide 360-degree coverage.

During 2018-2023, Raytheon Company will further enhance the system under a modernization task order from the United States Army, resulting in Configuration-3+. The order includes five annual, indefinite delivery/indefinite quantity task order awards with a total contract ceiling of more than $2.3 billion, funded by Patriot partner states. The initial $235 million award was allocated in January 2018.

The PDB 8 upgrade released in 2018 includes redesigned fire control computers which support MSE capabilities, new weapons control computers with increased processing power, and software enhancements to radar search and target detection and identification which help reduce friendly fire incidents. The latest PDB 8.1 software started testing in 2019 and will reach operational status by 2023. It adds a revamped game-style GUI named Warfighter to Machine Interface (WMI) which employs 3D graphics to render the terrain and the airspace. 

Future upgrades to the Patriot system will include new GhostEye radar (formerly Lower Tier Air and Missile Defense Sensor or LTAMDS) with support for a Integrated Air and Missile Defense Battle Command System (IBCS) - which will integrate Patriot's GhostEye, AN/MPQ-53 and AN/MPQ-65/65A radars with AN/MPQ-64 Sentinel and AN/TPS-80 G/ATOR, GhostEye MR (NASAMS), MFCR and SR from MEADS, AN/SPY-1 and AN/SPY-6 (Aegis BMD), AN/TPY-2 (THAAD and GMD) and AN/APG-81 (F-35 Lightning II) radars - and Mode 5 transponder interrogation in the identification friend or foe system.

The Patriot battalion
In the U.S. Army, the Patriot System is designed around the battalion echelon. A Patriot battalion consists of a headquarters battery, which includes the Patriot ICC and its operators), a maintenance company, and between four and six "line batteries", which are the actual launching batteries that employ the Patriot systems. Each line battery consists of (nominally) six launchers and three or four platoons: Fire Control platoon, Launcher platoon, and a Headquarters/Maintenance platoon - either a single platoon or separated into two separate units, at the battery commander's discretion. 

The Fire Control platoon is responsible for operating and maintaining the "big 4", radar, the engagement control station, the antenna mast group, and the electric power plant. The launcher platoon operates and maintains the launchers. The Headquarters/Maintenance platoon(s) provide the battery with maintenance support and a headquarters section. The Patriot line battery is commanded by a captain and usually consists of between 70 and 90 soldiers. The Patriot battalion is commanded by a lieutenant colonel and can include as many as 600 soldiers.

Once deployed, the system requires a crew of only three individuals to operate. The Tactical Control Officer (TCO), usually a lieutenant, is responsible for the operation of the system. The TCO is assisted by the Tactical Control Assistant (TCA). Communications are handled by the third crewmember, the communications system specialist. A "hot-crew" composed of an NCOIC (usually a Sergeant) and one or more additional launcher crew members is on-hand to repair or refuel launching stations. A reload crew is on standby to replace spent canisters after missiles are launched. The ICC crew is similar to the ECS crew at the battery level, except its operators are designated as the Tactical Director (TD) and the Tactical Director Assistant (TDA).

Patriot battalions prefer to operate in a centralized fashion, with the ICC controlling the launches of all of its subordinate launching batteries through the secure UHF PADIL communications network.

The dismounted Patriot ICC (D-PICC) is a set of equipment which is composed of the same hardware as that at battalion level, but which distributes command and control over the launching batteries, which allows the batteries to disperse over a wider geographic area, with no loss of command and control. D-PICC is deploying to Pacific Command first.

Operation
Following is the process a PAC-2 firing battery uses to engage a single target (an aircraft) with a single missile:

 A hostile aircraft is detected by the AN/MPQ-65 Radar. The radar examines the track's size, speed, altitude, and heading, and decides whether or not it is a legitimate track or "clutter" created by RF interference.
 If the track is classified by the radar as an aircraft, in the AN/MSQ-104 Engagement Control Station, an unidentified track appears on the screen of the Patriot operators. The operators examine the speed, altitude and heading of the track. Additionally, the IFF subsystem "pings" the track to determine if it has any IFF response.
 Based on many factors, including the track's speed, altitude, heading, IFF response, or its presence in "safe passage corridors" or "missile engagement zones", the ECS operator, the TCO (tactical control officer), makes an ID recommendation to the ICC operator, the TD (tactical director).
 The TD examines the track and decides to certify that it is hostile. Typically, the engagement authority for Patriot units rests with the Regional or Sector Air Defense Commander (RADC/SADC), who will be located either on a U.S. Navy guided missile cruiser or on a USAF AWACS aircraft. A Patriot operator (called the "ADAFCO" or Air Defense Artillery Fire Control Officer) is colocated with the RADC/SADC to facilitate communication to the Patriot battalions.
 The TD contacts the ADAFCO and correlates the track, ensuring that it is not a friendly aircraft.
 The ADAFCO obtains the engagement command from RADC/SADC, and delegates the engagement back down to the Patriot battalion.
 Once the engagement command is received, the TD selects a firing battery to take the shot and orders them to engage.
 The TCO instructs the TCA to engage the track. The TCA brings the system's launchers from "standby" into "operate".
 The TCA presses the "engage" switch indicator. This sends a signal to the selected launcher and fires a missile selected automatically by the system.
 The AN/MPQ-65 Radar, which has been continuously tracking the hostile aircraft, "acquires" the just-fired missile and begins feeding it interception data. The Radar also "illuminates" the target for the missile's semi-active radar seeker.
 The monopulse receiver in the missile's nose receives the reflection of illumination energy from the target. The track-via-missile uplink sends this data through an antenna in the missile's tail back to the AN/MPQ-65 set. In the ECS, computers calculate the maneuvers that the missile should perform in order to maintain a trajectory to the target and the TVM uplink sends these to the missile.
 Once in the vicinity of the target, the missile detonates its proximity fused warhead.

Following is the process a PAC-3 firing battery uses to engage a single tactical ballistic missile with two PAC-3 missiles:

 A missile is detected by the AN/MPQ-65 radar. The radar reviews the speed, altitude, behavior, and radar cross-section of the target. If this data lines up with the discrimination parameters set into the system, the missile is presented on the screen of the operator as a ballistic missile target.
 In the AN/MSQ-104 Engagement Control Station, the TCO reviews the speed, altitude, and trajectory of the track and then authorizes engagement. Upon authorizing engagement, the TCO instructs his TCA to bring the system's launchers into "operate" mode from "standby" mode. The engagement will take place automatically at the moment the computer defines the parameters that ensure the highest probability of kill.
 The system computer determines which of the battery's launchers have the highest probability of kill and selects them to fire. Two missiles are launched 4.2 seconds apart in a "ripple".
 The AN/MPQ-65 radar continues tracking the target and uploads intercept information to the PAC-3 missiles which are now outbound to intercept.
 Upon reaching its terminal homing phase, the Ka band active radar seeker in the nose of the PAC-3 missile acquires the inbound ballistic missile. This radar selects the radar return most likely to be the warhead of the incoming missile and directs the interceptor towards it.
 The ACMs (attitude control motors) of the PAC-3 missile fire to precisely align the missile on the interception trajectory.
 The interceptor flies straight through the warhead of the inbound ballistic missile, detonating it and destroying the missile.
 The second missile locates any debris which may be a warhead and attacks in a similar manner.

Operational history

Persian Gulf War (1991)

Trial by fire

Prior to the First Gulf War, ballistic missile defense was an unproven concept in war. During Operation Desert Storm, in addition to its anti-aircraft mission, Patriot was assigned to shoot down incoming Iraqi Scud or Al Hussein short range ballistic missiles launched at Israel and Saudi Arabia. The first combat use of Patriot occurred January 18, 1991, when it engaged what was later found to be a computer glitch. There were actually no Scuds fired at Saudi Arabia on January 18. This incident was widely misreported as the first successful interception of an enemy ballistic missile in history.

Throughout the war, Patriot missiles attempted engagement of over 40 hostile ballistic missiles. The success of these engagements, and in particular how many of them were real targets, is still controversial. Postwar video analysis of presumed interceptions by MIT professor Theodore Postol suggests that no Scud was actually hit. This analysis is contested by Peter D. Zimmerman, who claimed that photographs of the fuselage of downed Scud missiles in Saudi Arabia demonstrated that the Scud missiles were fired into Saudi Arabia and were riddled with fragments from the lethality enhancer of Patriot Missiles.

Failure at Dhahran
On February 25, 1991, an Iraqi Al Hussein Scud missile hit the barracks in Dhahran, Saudi Arabia, killing 28 soldiers from the U.S. Army's 14th Quartermaster Detachment.

A government investigation revealed that the failed intercept at Dhahran had been caused by a software error in the system's handling of timestamps. The Patriot missile battery at Dhahran had been in operation for 100 hours, by which time the system's internal clock had drifted by one-third of a second. Due to the missile's speed this was equivalent to a miss distance of 600 meters.

The radar system had successfully detected the Scud and predicted where to look for it next. However, the timestamps of the two radar pulses being compared were converted to floating point differently: one correctly, the other introducing an error proportionate to the operation time so far (100 hours) caused by the truncation in a 24-bit fixed-point register. As a result, the difference between the pulses was wrong, so the system looked in the wrong part of the sky and found no target. With no target, the initial detection was assumed to be a spurious track and the missile was removed from the system. No interception was attempted, and the Scud impacted on a makeshift barracks in an Al Khobar warehouse, killing 28 soldiers, the first Americans to be killed from the Scuds that Iraq had launched against Saudi Arabia and Israel.

Two weeks earlier, on February 11, 1991, the Israelis had identified the problem and informed the U.S. Army and the PATRIOT Project Office, the software manufacturer. As a stopgap measure, the Israelis had recommended rebooting the system's computers regularly. The manufacturer supplied updated software to the Army on February 26.

There had previously been failures in the MIM-104 system at the Joint Defense Facility Nurrungar in Australia, which was charged with processing signals from satellite-based early launch detection systems.

Success rate vs. accuracy
On February 15, 1991, President George H. W. Bush traveled to Raytheon's Patriot manufacturing plant in Andover, Massachusetts, during the Gulf War. He declared, the "Patriot is 41 for 42: 42 Scuds engaged, 41 intercepted!" The President's claimed success rate was over 97% at that point in the war.

On April 7, 1992 Theodore Postol of the Massachusetts Institute of Technology, and Reuven Pedatzur of Tel Aviv University testified before a House Committee stating that, according to their independent analysis of video tapes, the Patriot system had a success rate of below 10%, and perhaps even a zero success rate. Also on April 7, 1992, Charles A. Zraket of Harvard Kennedy School and Peter D. Zimmerman of the Center for Strategic and International Studies testified about the calculation of success rates and accuracy in Israel and Saudi Arabia and discounted many of the statements and methodologies in Postol's report. According to Zimmerman, it is important to note the difference in terms when analyzing the performance of the system during the war:
 Success rate – the percentage of Scuds destroyed or deflected to unpopulated areas
 Accuracy – the percentage of hits out of all the Patriots fired

In accordance with the standard firing doctrine, on average four Patriots were launched at each incoming Scud in Saudi Arabia an average of three Patriots were fired. The large number of missiles fired suggests low confidence in individual missiles and that a higher rate of successful interceptions was achieved through brute force. For example, if a Patriot has a 50% individual success rate, two missiles will intercept 75% of the time, and three will intercept 87.5% of the time. Only one has to hit for a successful interception, but this does not mean that the other missiles would not also have hit. 

The Iraqi redesign of the Scuds also played a role. Iraq had redesigned its Scuds by removing weight from the warhead to increase speed and range, but the changes weakened the missile and made it unstable during flight, creating a tendency for the Scud to break up during its descent from near space. This presented a larger number of targets as it was unclear which piece contained the warhead.

According to the Zraket testimony, there was a lack of high quality photographic equipment necessary to record the interceptions of targets.  Therefore, Patriot crews recorded each launch on standard-definition videotape, which was insufficient for detailed analysis. Damage assessment teams videotaped the Scud debris that was found on the ground. Crater analysis was then used to determine if the warhead was destroyed before the debris crashed or not. Part of the reason for the 30% improvement in success rate in Saudi Arabia compared to Israel is that the Patriot merely had to push the incoming Scud missiles away from military targets in the desert or disable the Scud's warhead in order to avoid casualties, while in Israel the Scuds were aimed directly at cities and civilian populations. 

The Saudi Government also censored any reporting of Scud damage by the Saudi press. The Israeli Government did not institute the same type of censorship. Patriot's success rate in Israel was examined by the IDF (Israel Defense Forces) who did not have a political reason to play up Patriot's success rate.  The IDF counted any Scud that exploded on the ground, regardless of whether or not it was diverted, as a failure for the Patriot.  Meanwhile, the U.S. Army, which had many reasons to support a high success rate for Patriot, examined the performance of Patriot in Saudi Arabia.

Both testimonies state that part of the problems stem from its original design as an anti-aircraft system. Patriot was designed with proximity fused warheads, which are designed to explode immediately prior to hitting a target spraying shrapnel out in a fan in front of the missile, either destroying or disabling the target. These missiles were fired at the target's center of mass.  With aircraft this was fine, but considering the much higher speeds of tactical ballistic missiles, as well as the location of the warhead, usually in the nose, Patriot most often hit closer to the tail of the Scud due to the delay present in the proximity fused warhead, thus not destroying the missile's warhead and allowing it to fall to earth.

In response to the testimonies and other evidence, the staff of the House Government Operations Subcommittee on Legislation and National Security reported, "The Patriot missile system was not the spectacular success in the Persian Gulf War that the American public was led to believe. There is little evidence to prove that the Patriot hit more than a few Scud missiles launched by Iraq during the Gulf War, and there are some doubts about even these engagements. The public and the United States Congress were misled by definitive statements of success issued by administration and Raytheon representatives during and after the war."

A Canadian Fifth Estate documentary, The Best Defence,in February 2003 quoted the former Israeli Defense Minister as saying the Israeli government was so dissatisfied with the performance of the missile defense, that they were preparing their own military retaliation on Iraq regardless of U.S. objections. That response was canceled only with the ceasefire with Iraq.

US led invasion of Iraq (2003)
Patriot was deployed to Iraq a second time in 2003, this time to provide air and missile defense for the forces conducting Operation Iraqi Freedom (OIF). Patriot PAC-3, GEM, and GEM+ missiles both had a very high success rate, intercepting Al-Samoud 2 and Ababil-100 tactical ballistic missiles. No longer-range ballistic missiles were fired during that conflict. The systems were stationed in Kuwait and Iraq, and successfully destroyed a number of hostile surface-to-surface missiles using the new PAC-3 and guidance enhanced missiles.

Patriot missile batteries were involved in three friendly fire incidents. On March 23, 2003 a Royal Air Force Tornado was shot down, killing both crew members, Flight Lieutenant Kevin Barry Main (Pilot) and Flight Lieutenant David Rhys Williams (Navigator/WSO). On March 24, 2003, a USAF F-16CJ Fighting Falcon fired a HARM anti-radiation missile at a Patriot missile battery after the Patriot's radar had locked onto and prepared to fire at the aircraft, causing the pilot to mistake it for an Iraqi surface-to-air missile system because the aircraft was in air combat operations and was on its way to a mission near Baghdad. The HARM destroyed the Patriot's radar system with no casualties. 

Afterwards the Patriot Radar was examined and continued to operate, but was replaced due to a chance that a fragment might have penetrated it and gone undetected.  On April 2, 2003, two PAC-3 missiles shot down a USN F/A-18 Hornet, killing U.S. Navy Lieutenant Nathan D. White of VFA-195, Carrier Air Wing Five.

Service with Israel

The Israeli Air Defense Command operates MIM-104D Patriot (PAC-2/GEM+) batteries with Israeli upgrades. The Israel Defense Forces' designation for the Patriot weapon system is "Yahalom" (diamond).

Operation Protective Edge (2014)
During Operation Protective Edge, Patriot batteries of the Israeli Air Defense Command intercepted and destroyed two unmanned aerial vehicles launched by Hamas. The interception of a Hamas drone in July 2014, was the first time in the history of the Patriot system's use that it successfully intercepted an enemy aircraft.

Syrian civil war (2014–)
In August 2014, a Syrian unmanned aerial vehicle was shot down by an Israeli Air Defense Command MIM-104D Patriot missile near Quneitra, after it had penetrated Israeli airspace over the Golan Heights. In September 2014, a Syrian Air Force Sukhoi Su-24 was shot down in similar circumstances.

In July 2016, two Israeli Patriot missiles missed an incoming drone launched from Syria, according to Russian media. Israeli Air Defence Command fired two Patriot missiles, but they did not manage to destroy the target. Russia Today stated that the drone penetrated four kilometers into Israeli airspace, and then flew back into Syria.

In April 2017, another Syrian UAV was shot down by an Israeli Patriot battery which fired two missiles against the target. In September 2017, a Hezbollah intelligence drone was shot down as it tried infiltrating Israel through the Golan border.

In June 2018, a single Israeli Patriot missile was fired toward a drone which was approaching Israel from Syria. The missile missed its target, and the drone turned back to Syria.

On the afternoon of July 11, 2018, an Israeli Patriot missile shot down a drone which was approaching Israel from Syria.

On the afternoon of July 13, 2018, an Israeli Patriot missile shot down a drone which was approaching Israel from Syria.

On July 24, 2018, an Israeli Patriot missile shot down a Syrian Sukhoi Su-22 fighter which had crossed into Israeli airspace.

Service with Saudi Arabia
In June 2015, a Patriot battery was used to shoot down a Scud missile, fired at Saudi Arabia by Houthi rebels in response to the Saudi Arabian-led intervention in Yemen. Another Scud was fired at an electricity station in Jizan province and intercepted by a Saudi Patriot in August 2015.

Saudi Arabia claims that another long-range ballistic missile was fired toward Mecca and intercepted by a Saudi Patriot in October 2016. Houthi sources said that the missile's intended target was the air force base in King Abdulaziz International Airport in Jeddah, 65 km (40miles) north-west of Mecca.

In March 2018, another missile, apparently fired from Yemen, was intercepted by a Patriot missile over Riyadh. Missile experts via news agencies cast doubt on the effectiveness of the Saudi Arabian Patriot defense. According to videos, one interceptor exploded just after launch and another did a "U turn" midair toward Riyadh.

In September 2019, the six battalions of Patriot missile defense systems owned by Saudi Arabia failed to protect its oil facilities from attacks by multiple drones and suspected cruise missiles during the Abqaiq–Khurais attack.

In May 2020, the United States removed two of its four Patriot antimissile batteries securing oil fields in Saudi Arabia following an easing of tensions with Iran. They were to be replaced by Saudi's own Patriot batteries.

In February 2021, a Patriot battery intercepted a ballistic missile over Riyadh that was fired by Houthis as a Formula E race was held on the outskirts of the city in Diriyah, attended by Crown Prince Mohammed bin Salman.

Service with the United Arab Emirates
According to Brigadier General Murad Turaiq, the commander of some of the Yemeni forces allied to the Saudi-led coalition currently fighting in Yemen, Patriot air defense systems deployed to Yemen by the United Arab Emirates (UAE) have successfully intercepted two ballistic missiles fired by Houthi forces. General Turaiq told the Abu Dhabi-based The National newspaper on November 14, 2015 that the first missile was shot down late the previous day in the Al-Gofainah area and a second was intercepted before it hit the building hosting the control centre for forces operating in Marib and Al-Baydah provinces. Airbus Defence and Space satellite imagery obtained by IHS Jane's showed two Patriot fire units, each with two launchers, deployed at the Safir airstrip in Marib province on October 1.

Talisman Sabre Exercise 
In July 2021, the US Army used a battery of Patriot missiles in the Exercise Talisman Saber in the Shoalwater Bay Training Area in Queensland, Australia. The US Army test fired Patriot PAC2 interceptor missiles and successfully intercepted target drones.

Service with Poland and Ukraine 
On 9 March 2022, the U.S. European Command announced,  in response to Russia's invasion of Ukraine, that it  would send two Patriot air defense systems to Poland to "proactively counter any potential threat to U.S. and Allied forces and NATO territory". Poland asked Germany to transfer the Patriots to Ukraine. Germany declined.

On 19 December, Ukraine President Zelenskyy talked about negotiating personally with US President Biden over a potential transfer of Patriot missile systems. He said they offer "a (better) distance, radius of reflection, protection." Ukrainian Foreign Minister Dmytro Kuleba said that this was the most difficult diplomatic issue they had faced.

On 20 December, it was reported that President Biden's administration would be delivering another $1.85 billion in aid to Ukraine that would include a Patriot Battery On 21 December, President Biden confirmed during a meeting with President Zelenskyy in front of the press at the White House that the United States would send a Patriot battery to Ukraine. It would take "months" to train the "dozens" of soldiers needed to operate the system, probably in Germany. The system, with PAC-3, would cost US$4 million per missile. Providing a Patriot missile system is seen as a symbol of Western engagement in the conflict, although its range is only local.

On 5 January 2023, Germany announced that it would supply one Patriot battery to Ukraine.

On 17 January 2023, it was reported that the Netherlands intended to send a Patriot battery, in tandem with Germany and the United States.

Operators

Current operators:

 German Air Force
 Flugabwehrraketengeschwader 1

 Hellenic Air Force
 350 Guided Missiles Wing
 21st Guided Missile Squadron
 22nd Guided Missile Squadron
 23rd Guided Missile Squadron
 24th Guided Missile Squadron 
 25th Guided Missile Squadron 
 26th Guided Missile Squadron 

 Israeli Air Force
 Israeli Air Defense Command (GEM+ "Yahalom") – to be replaced by David's Sling

 Japan Air Self-Defense Force
 Air Defense Missile Training Unit (ADMTU) (PAC-2 & PAC-3)
 1st Air Defense Missile Group (1st ADMG) (PAC-2 & PAC-3)
 2nd Air Defense Missile Group (2nd ADMG) (PAC-2 & PAC-3)
 3rd Air Defense Missile Group (3rd ADMG) (PAC-2 & PAC-3)
 4th Air Defense Missile Group (4th ADMG) (PAC-2 & PAC-3)
 5th Air Defense Missile Group (5th ADMG) (PAC-2 & PAC-3)
 6th Air Defense Missile Group (6th ADMG) (PAC-2 & PAC-3)

 Jordanian Air Force
JAF operates three or four Patriot missile batteries, acquired from Germany. Batteries are in operational deployment.

 Kuwait Air Force
In August 2010, the US Defense Security Cooperation Agency announced that Kuwait had formally requested to buy 209 MIM-104E PAC-2 missiles. In August 2012, Kuwait purchased 60 MIM-104F PAC-3 missiles, along with four radars and 20 launchers.

 Royal Moroccan Armed Forces
 PAC-3 ordered and to be operated by Royal Moroccan Army

 Royal Netherlands Army
 Joint Ground-based Air Defence Command 802 Squadron (PAC-2 & PAC-3)

 Polish Armed Forces
In March 2018 the Ministry of National Defence signed the deal worth $4.75 billion for two Patriot Configuration 3+ batteries for deliveries in 2022. The purchase includes Northrop Grumman's Integrated Air and Missile Defense Battle Command System (IBCS) and four fire units equipped with four AN/MPQ-65 radars, 16 launchers, four Engagement Control Stations, six Engagement Operation Centers, 12 IFCN Relays and 208 PAC-3 MSE missiles. In December 2022 the first battery was delivered to Poland.

 Qatar Armed Forces
Serves in the Qatar Emiri Air Force

In November 2012, it was announced the export from the United States of 246 MIM-104E GEM-T and 786 PAC-3 missiles and related equipment. Declared operational in November 2018.

 Romanian Air Force
 74th Patriot Regiment (PAC-2 GEM-T & PAC-3 MSE)
The Romanian Air Force received its first system of Patriot surface-to-air missiles in September 2020.
The government of Romania signed in November 2017 an agreement to purchase seven Patriot Configuration 3  units, complete with radars, a control station, antennas, launching stations, and power plants.[102] Included are 56 Patriot MIM-104E Guidance Enhanced Missile TBM (GEM-T) missiles and 168 Patriot Advanced Capability – 3 Missile Segment Enhancement missiles. The sale, according to the Defense Security Cooperation Agency notification, could be worth up to $3.9 billion. Romania is the 14th Patriot customer worldwide and one of the two former Warsaw Pact states to receive one.

 Royal Saudi Air Defense
 Part of "Peace Shield" Air Defense Profile

 Republic of Korea Air Force Air Defense & Guided Missile Command 
 1st Air Defense Artillery Brigade (1st ADAB) (PAC-2 & PAC-3)
 2nd Air Defense Artillery Brigade (2nd ADAB) (PAC-2 & PAC-3)
 3rd Air Defense Artillery Brigade (3rd ADAB) (PAC-2 & PAC-3)

 Spanish Army
 Regimiento de Artillería antiaérea 73

 Swedish Armed Forces 
 Air Defence Regiment (Robot 103A (PAC-2 GEM-T) & Robot 103B (PAC-3 MSE) 
Sweden decided in competition with  Aster 30 SAMP/T to request an offer for the Patriot system in November 2017 and in August 2018 an agreement was signed for four units and 12 launchers to form two battalions. No follow-up orders are to be made.
The initial cost was to be around 10 billion SEK but the price is deemed much higher the granted funds for the sale is $3.2 Billion, known as Luftvärnssystem 103 (Anti-air system 103) in Swedish service, would be delivered in 2021 and 2022. 

The first Swedish troops were training on the system at Fort Sill in December 2018. The Swedish Defence Materiel Administration accepted the first deliveries in April 2021 and System Integration and Check Out was initiated by Swedish Armed Forces. The system was officially activated with the Swedish Armed forces in November 2021. The final unit was delivered in December 2022.

 Republic of China (Taiwan) Armed Forces GHQ Missile Command

 United Arab Emirates Armed Forces
In 2014, the United Arab Emirates closed a deal (nearly $4 billion) with Lockheed Martin and Raytheon to buy and operate the latest development of the PAC-3 system, as well as 288 of Lockheed's PAC-3 missiles, and 216 GEM-T missiles. The deal is part of the development of a national defense system to protect the Emirates from air threats. In 2019, The United Arab Emirates Armed Forces purchased 452 Patriot Advanced Capability 3 (PAC-3) Missiles Segment Enhanced (MSE) and related equipment for an estimated cost of $2.728 billion.

The US Army operates a total of 1,106 Patriot launchers. In 2010, 483 were in service.
 United States Army
 11th Air Defense Artillery Brigade(11 ADA BDE)
 1st Battalion, 43rd Air Defense Artillery Regiment (1-43 ADA)
 2nd Battalion, 43rd Air Defense Artillery Regiment (2-43 ADA)
 3rd Battalion, 43rd Air Defense Artillery Regiment (3-43 ADA)
 5th Battalion, 52nd Air Defense Artillery Regiment (5-52 ADA)
 31st Air Defense Artillery Brigade(31 ADA BDE)
 3rd Battalion, 2nd Air Defense Artillery Regiment (3-2 ADA)
 4th Battalion, 3rd Air Defense Artillery Regiment (4-3 ADA)
 69th Air Defense Artillery Brigade  (69 ADA BDE)
 4th Battalion, 5th Air Defense Artillery Regiment (4-5 ADA)
 1st Battalion, 44th Air Defense Artillery Regiment (1-44 ADA)
 1st Battalion, 62nd Air Defense Artillery Regiment (United States) (1-62 ADA)
 108th Air Defense Artillery Brigade (108 ADA BDE)
 1st Battalion, 7th Air Defense Artillery Regiment (1-7 ADA)
 3rd Battalion, 4th Air Defense Artillery Regiment (3-4 ADA)
 35th Air Defense Artillery Brigade (35 ADA BDE), Eighth Army
 2nd Battalion, 1st Air Defense Artillery Regiment (2-1 ADA)
 6th Battalion, 52nd Air Defense Artillery Regiment (6-52 ADA)
 38th Air Defense Artillery Brigade
 1st Battalion, 1st Air Defense Artillery Regiment (1-1 ADA)
 5th Battalion, 7th Air Defense Artillery Regiment (5-7 ADA)
 3rd Battalion, 6th Air Defense Artillery Regiment (3-6 ADA)

Future operators

 Armed Forces of Ukraine
3 batteries expected in total. On 21 December, 2022 it was reported that the United States would send a Patriot battery to Ukraine as a part of military aid. On 5 January, 2023 it was reported that Germany would send a Patriot battery to Ukraine as a part of their own military aid package. On 17 January, 2023, the Netherlands announced it will send one launcher, and on 20 January, the Netherlands announced it will send a second launcher. The Dutch government announced it will send launchers (Dutch: lanceerinrichtingen) and missiles, not complete systems (a battery) which includes radars, etc.

See also
 List of medium-range and long-range SAMs
 David's Sling
 Ground-Based Midcourse Defense
 Indian Ballistic Missile Defence Programme
 Khordad 15 (medium-range air defense system)
 Lockheed Martin ALHTK
 Medium Extended Air Defense System
 National Missile Defense
 S-400 missile system
 S-500 missile system
 SAMP/T
 Sayyad-2 – launcher of Iranian Sayyad-2 system consists of four canisters in 2×2 configuration, very similar to American MIM-104 Patriot launchers
 Terminal High Altitude Area Defense
 U.S. Army Aviation and Missile Command
 XRSAM

References

External links

 Aerojet Rocketdyne PAC-3 MSE  
 CSIS Missile Threat – Patriot
 Official Raytheon (missile contractor) PATRIOT web site
 MIM-104 Patriot – Armed Forces International
 Lockheed Martin Patriot MIM-104E PAC III, H.A.F

Cold War surface-to-air missiles of the United States
MIM-104
Missile defense
Anti-ballistic missiles of the United States
Raytheon Company products
Military equipment introduced in the 1980s